This list of Cal Poly Pomona people includes notable matriculating students, and alumni that have graduated or are non-matriculating students of California State Polytechnic University, Pomona, a public university, and one of the 23 general campuses of the California State University located in Pomona, California.

Alumni

Athletics

Business

Education

Entertainment

Government

Faculty

Active faculty

Retired, deceased, and former faculty

University presidents
The following people have served as presidents of Cal Poly Pomona:

Honorary degrees
Cal Poly Pomona has conferred 25 honorary doctorate degrees since 1969.

References

Cal Poly Pomona people